C. gilberti may refer to:

Candalides gilberti, a butterfly species
Cilus gilberti, a saltwater fish species
Cirripectes gilberti, a blenny species
Citharichthys gilberti, a flatfish species
Conus gilberti, a sea snail species